The teams competing in Group 5 of the 2002 UEFA European Under-21 Championship qualifying competition were Croatia, Belgium, Scotland and Latvia.

Standings

Matches
All times are CET.

Goalscorers
3 goals
 Mihael Mikić

2 goals

 Tim Smolders
 Davy Theunis
 Mate Bilić
 Zvonimir Deranja
 Ivica Olić

1 goal

 Ian Claes
 Grégory Dufer
 Kristof Imschoot
 Tom Soetaers
 Romans Bezzubovs
 Ģirts Karlsons
 Vladimirs Koļesņičenko
 Richard Hughes
 Craig Easton
 Mark Burchill
 Kenny Miller
 Kevin McNaughton
 Alex Notman

External links
 Group 6 at UEFA.com

Group 6